Alagez may refer to:
Alagyaz, town in Armenia
Aragats, Talin, town in Armenia 
Russian ship Alagez, a Russian ship